Group B of the 2021 Copa América, also referred to as the North Zone, took place from 13 to 27 June 2021 in Brazil. The group consisted of defending champions and hosts Brazil, former co-hosts Colombia, Venezuela, Ecuador and Peru. It would also have included guests Qatar before their withdrawal on 23 February 2021.

Originally, Group B was scheduled to be played from 13 June to 1 July 2020. However, on 17 March 2020 the tournament was postponed to 2021 due to the COVID-19 pandemic in South America.

On 20 May 2021, due to security concerns amid protests against the government of President Iván Duque Márquez, Colombia was dropped as co-host of the tournament.

Teams

Standings

In the quarter-finals:
The winners of Group B, Brazil, advanced to play the fourth-placed team of Group A, Chile.
The runners-up of Group B, Peru, advanced to play the third-placed team of Group A, Paraguay.
The third-placed team of Group B, Colombia, advanced to play the runners-up of Group A, Uruguay.
The fourth-placed team of Group B, Ecuador, advanced to play the winners of Group A, Argentina.

Matches
The original 2020 schedule and kick-off times were announced on 3 December 2019 and 4 March 2020 respectively. The new 2021 schedule was announced on 13 August 2020. Following the withdrawal of Qatar, the shortened schedule was announced on 15 March 2021. The final match schedule with Brazil as host country was announced on 2 June 2021.

Matchday 1

Brazil vs Venezuela

Colombia vs Ecuador

Matchday 2

Colombia vs Venezuela

Brazil vs Peru

Matchday 3

Venezuela vs Ecuador

Colombia vs Peru

Matchday 4

Ecuador vs Peru

Brazil vs Colombia

Matchday 5

Brazil vs Ecuador

Venezuela vs Peru

Discipline
Fair play points were to be used as a tiebreaker if the overall and head-to-head records of teams were tied. These were calculated based on yellow and red cards received in all group matches as follows:
first yellow card: minus 1 point;
indirect red card (second yellow card): minus 3 points;
direct red card: minus 4 points;
yellow card and direct red card: minus 5 points;

Only one of the above deductions was applied to a player in a single match.

Notes

References

External links

Copa América 2021, CONMEBOL.com

Group B